Niclas Baker (born 9 September 1994) is a British athlete who competes in the sprints, predominantly the 400 metres.

Baker attended the Emanuel School in London. His current athletics club is Piotr Spas in Tooting. Baker has combined his athletics training with working for the NHS in Neurology and Dialysis teams for a number of years. Baker won silver in the 400m at the British Championships in 2020, missing out on gold by less than 2 tenths of a second to Alex Knibbs.

On 26 June 2021, Baker went one better than his result in the previous year by winning the 400m title at the 2021 British Athletics Championships. Three days later, he was named in the sprinter pool for the 4 x 400 metres relay at the delayed 2020 Summer Olympics in Tokyo.

References

External links
 

1994 births
Living people
British male sprinters
Athletes (track and field) at the 2020 Summer Olympics
British Athletics Championships winners
Olympic athletes of Great Britain